John Rees may refer to:

John Rees (activist) (born 1957), British political activist and writer
John Rees (cricketer) (1880-1959), Australian cricketer
John Rees (journalist) (c. 1926), right-wing publisher and informant
John Rees (musician) (1857–1949), Welsh musician
John Rees (bassist) (born 1951), Australian bassist, known for being part of the classic line-up of rock band Men at Work
Conway Rees (1870–1932), John Conway Rees, Welsh rugby union international
Sir John David Rees (1854–1922), colonial administrator in British India and Member of Parliament
Sir John Milsom Rees (1866–1952), Welsh surgeon
John Rawlings Rees (1890–1969), British psychiatrist
John Rees-Evans (born 1978), British political candidate

See also
Jonny Rees, Hong Kong rugby union player
Jonny Rees (model), Mr. Wales 2008
John Reese (disambiguation)
John Rhys (1840–1915), scholar
John Rhys-Davies (born 1944), Welsh actor